The 1880 Atlantic hurricane season ran through the summer and fall of 1880. This is the period of each year when most tropical cyclones form in the Atlantic basin. In the 1880 Atlantic season there were two tropical storms, seven hurricanes, and two major hurricanes (Category 3+). However, in the absence of modern satellite and other remote-sensing technologies, only storms that affected populated land areas or encountered ships at sea were recorded, so the actual total could be higher. An undercount bias of zero to six tropical cyclones per year between 1851 and 1885 and zero to four per year between 1886 and 1910 has been estimated. Of the known 1880 cyclones, Hurricane Six was first documented in 1995 by José Fernández-Partagás and Henry Díaz. They also proposed large changes to the known tracks of several other storms for this year and 're-instated' Hurricane Ten to the database. A preliminary reanalysis by Michael Chenoweth, published in 2014, found thirteen storms, nine hurricanes, and four major hurricanes.

Seasonal summary 

The Atlantic hurricane database (HURDAT) recognizes eleven tropical cyclones for the 1880 season. In the 1880 there were two tropical storms, seven hurricanes, and two major hurricanes in the Atlantic basin. Several of the storms caused considerable loss of life. Tropical Storm One impacted the Texas coast in late June. Hurricane Two was, at one point, an intense Category 4 hurricane. It caused extensive destruction and loss of life at Matamoros, Mexico, and at Port Isabel, Texas. Hurricane Three impacted Cuba, Jamaica and the Bahamas; it caused thirty deaths in Jamaica. Hurricane Four made two landfalls, both in Florida. The first was near present-day Cocoa Beach on August 29 as a Category 2 hurricane and the second was on the Florida Panhandle as a tropical storm. The storm caused a shipwreck resulting in several deaths. Hurricane Five was a Category 1 hurricane active between August 26 and September 4, which remained at sea. Hurricane Six originated as a tropical storm in the Gulf of Mexico, which, having crossed the Florida peninsula, developed into a Category 1 hurricane off the coast of South Carolina on September 9. Hurricane Seven was a Category 1 hurricane first seen on September 8 off the coast of Georgia. It moved northwards and on September 10 hit Newfoundland as a tropical storm. Hurricane Eight was an intense Category 4 hurricane active at the end of September and start of October. It did not make landfall anywhere but was responsible for several shipwrecks. Hurricane Nine developed from a tropical storm in the Gulf of Mexico. It impacted both the Yucatán Peninsula and Florida and brought violent gales along the Eastern Seaboard between Cape Hatteras and Jacksonville, Florida. Hurricane Ten was a Category 1 hurricane that formed south of Bermuda on October 10. Although it never made landfall and weakened first to a tropical storm then to an extratropical storm within a week, it did strike several ships. The last storm of the year was Tropical Storm Eleven which is known to have existed for three days in October to the northeast of the Abaco Islands.

The season generated an accumulated cyclone energy (ACE) of 131 units, which was above the 1981–2010 median of 92. Based on other metrics, however, the season was near average.

Systems

Tropical Storm One 

On the same date, the schooner James Andrew registered a small area of severe winds and squalls. At 15:00 UTC on June 25, the slow-moving cyclone made landfall southwest of present-day Bay City, Texas. The system then weakened rapidly as it headed inland, dissipating eighteen hours later. A weather station in Galveston recorded  of rain in an eight-hour period. No other effects were reported in Texas or in neighbouring Louisiana. A preliminary reanalysis in 2014 concluded that the system did not qualify as an organized tropical system.

Hurricane Two 

On August 9, the hurricane struck the Yucatán Peninsula near Puerto Morelos, and weakened significantly as it headed inland. Reaching the southern Gulf of Mexico as a tropical storm on August 10, the cyclone then underwent steady intensification: forty-eight hours later, it became a major hurricane, and peaked at  early on August 13. The system weakened as it paralleled the Rio Grande, curved into South Texas, and dissipated on August 14.

The storm caused several ships to be lost or stranded in or near the Yucatán Channel. Hurricane-force winds occurred offshore of western Cuba. Hitting close to the Mexico–United States border, the powerful cyclone severely impacted both nations. The pressure in the storm was determined to be  at the time of landfall, based on a reading of  coincident with hurricane-force winds at Brownsville, an inland site. The cyclone destroyed three hundred homes in Matamoros and downed buildings and fences in Brownsville. At the latter place, debris covered streets. Strong winds destroyed twenty structures at Fort Brown, the barracks sustained damage, and thirty-five horses and mules died. Ten vessels sank in the Rio Grande and at Port Isabel, resulting in three deaths. The storm also ruined  of track bed in Texas. Seven deaths took place on land: two in Matamoros, "at least" five in Brownsville. Total fatalities in the storm numbered thirty or more, primarily at sea.

Hurricane Three 

Pursuing a parabolic path, it headed west-southwest across Saint Lucia, and a ship noted heavy squalls near Guadeloupe. On August 16, the fast-moving tropical storm, then nearing hurricane intensity, turned westward over the eastern Caribbean Sea. At 00:00 UTC on August 18, upon reaching hurricane status, it commenced a northwestward course toward Jamaica. The storm lost hurricane intensity after landfall, turned to the north-northeast, and swiftly crossed the Bahamas on August 20.

In Jamaica, the storm inflicted "immense" destruction. At Yallahs, the storm wrecked fifty-nine houses. In Saint George Parish, 116 homes were levelled. Hundreds of homes were destroyed at Richmond. The local hospital, chapels, and a church were destroyed at Morant Bay. In Saint John Parish, the storm destroyed forty houses. The military barracks at Up-Park Camp were destroyed, with losses totalling $50,000. Banana crops were destroyed in a  area near Port Maria. Of the forty-five vessels at anchor in Kingston, only two were undamaged. Most of the wharves in Kingston were destroyed. The hurricane was responsible for thirty deaths in Jamaica. The hurricane brought squally conditions to eastern Cuba.

Hurricane Four 

A tropical storm formed over the central Atlantic on August 24. It moved steadily westward, reaching hurricane strength on the 26th. The next day it reached its peak of  winds. The storm would retain that intensity until after it had made landfall just to the south of Cocoa Beach, Florida on August 29. It passed over the peninsula, weakening to a tropical storm, but managed to become a hurricane prior to its second Florida landfall on the 31st. The storm continued northwestward, dissipating over Mississippi on the September 1. The hurricane caused 68 deaths when, near St. Augustine, it caused a steamship, the Veracruz, to be wrecked.

Hurricane Five 

This minimal hurricane formed in the mid-Atlantic on August 26. It came close to Bermuda and reached peak windspeeds of nearly 80 knots. The system was picked up by a frontal system on August 30 and recurved east-northeastward, before dissipating on September 4.

Hurricane Six 

A tropical storm formed in the Gulf of Mexico on September 6. It travelled eastward to cross the Florida panhandle, north of Tampa on September 8 before developing into a Category 1 hurricane off the coast of South Carolina on September 9. This hurricane continued to move up the Mid-Atlantic coastline before becoming an extratropical storm on September 11 off Nova Scotia.

Hurricane Seven 

A Category 1 hurricane was first observed on September 8 off the coast of Georgia. It moved northeast and on September 10 hit Newfoundland as a tropical storm before dissipating east of Newfoundland later that same day.

Hurricane Eight 

A tropical storm formed in the mid-Atlantic on September 27. Over the next few days it moved slowly westward as it grew in strength. By October 1 it was 500 miles south of Bermuda and had reached Category 4 strength. It maintained that strength throughout October 2 but began weakening as it started to move north on October 3. By October 4 it was a Category 2 storm and had curved eastward. It was last seen as a Category 1 hurricane on October 4. It never made landfall but did cause several ships to sink. On October 2, a number of ships that encountered the storm as a Category 4 hurricane recorded central pressure readings of 27.40 inches.

Hurricane Nine 

On October 5, a tropical storm formed in the western Caribbean. It passed over the Yucatán Peninsula the following day, and while moving northeastward through the Gulf of Mexico, developed into a Category 1 hurricane.
It weakened to a tropical storm as it moved over Florida on October 8, having made landfall south of Cedar Key and passed out to sea near St. Augustine. Violent gales were reported between Cape Hatteras and Jacksonville. The maximum wind recorded at Jacksonville was 36 mph from the SE, and 52 mph was noted at Savannah.
The storm regained Category 1 strength in the Atlantic before dissipating south of Bermuda on October 10.

Hurricane Ten 

A minimal, Category 1 hurricane was first seen south of Bermuda on October 10. It remained at that intensity while curving eastward. Still south of Bermuda it weakened into a tropical storm and began travelling north. It was last seen on October 16, east of Newfoundland, as an extratropical storm. A number of ships were struck and damaged by the hurricane. A bark, "Witch" was abandoned and her crew rescued by another ship while a report was received from North Sydney, Cape Breton that a schooner, the "Anne Linwood", had capsized off Cape Smokey.

Tropical Storm Eleven 

A tropical storm formed north-east of the Abaco Islands on October 20. It travelled due north for three days and became extratropical on October 24, prior to reaching the New England coast.

See also 

 Atlantic hurricane season
 Tropical cyclone observation
 Atlantic hurricane reanalysis project

Footnotes

References

External links 
 1880 Monthly Weather Review
 HURDAT Data for the 1880 Atlantic hurricane season

 
Atlantic Hurricane Season, 1880
Articles which contain graphical timelines
1880 natural disasters